Kentner is a surname. Notable people with the surname include:

Bernice Kentner (1929–2018), American cosmetologist, author, and color theorist
Louis Kentner (1905–1987), Hungarian-born British pianist

See also
Kenner (surname)
Kentner Stadium

Surnames of German origin